Alaina Williams (born January 30, 1990) is an American trampoline gymnast.

Early life and education
Williams was born in Amarillo, Texas, and attended Amarillo High School. She is currently attending The University of Oklahoma.

Career
Williams won the 2010 United States championship and earned a bronze medal at the 2011 Pan American Games.

Personal life
Williams is married to gymnast Steven Legendre.

References

External links 
 Alaina Williams on USA Gymnastics
 

1990 births
Living people
Sportspeople from Amarillo, Texas
American female trampolinists
Gymnasts at the 2011 Pan American Games
Pan American Games medalists in gymnastics
Pan American Games bronze medalists for the United States
Medalists at the 2011 Pan American Games
University of Oklahoma alumni
21st-century American women